Sri Lanka competed in the 2008 Summer Olympics held in Beijing, People's Republic of China from August 8 to August 24, 2008.The Sri Lankan olympic committee confirmed 4 males and three females have been selected to compete in 5 sports. Later Chinthana Vidanage received a tripartite commission invitation to participate in weightlifting. This now brings the total count to 8 athletes competing in 6 sports.

Athletics

Susanthika Jayasinghe has been selected to represent Sri Lanka at the 2008 summer olympics in Athletics. She was selected to compete in both 100 m and 200 m. But soon after landed, she decided not to compete in the 100 metres. Nadeeka Lakmali has qualified to represent Sri Lanka in the javelin throw.

Women
Track & road events

Field events

Key
Note–Ranks given for track events are within the athlete's heat only
Q = Qualified for the next round
q = Qualified for the next round as a fastest loser or, in field events, by position without achieving the qualifying target
NR = National record
N/A = Round not applicable for the event
Bye = Athlete not required to compete in round

Badminton

Boxing

Sri Lanka qualified one boxer for the Olympic boxing tournament. Anurudha Rathnayake earned a spot in the Olympic flyweight competition with his performance at the 2007 World Championships.

Shooting

Sri Lanka qualified one shooter for the Olympic Shooting tournament. Edirisinghe Senanayake qualified in the 50 m Pistol Men event by virtue of finishing in the first qualifying position (not first overall) at the 2007 Asian shooting championships in Kuwait.

Men

Swimming

Mayumi Raheem and Daniel Lee have been selected to represent Sri Lanka at the 2008 Summer Olympics in Swimming. Daniel Lee competed in the 50 m Freestyle, Heat 6 on Thursday, August 14.

Men

Women

Weightlifting

Chinthana Vidanage was given a Tripartite commission invitation to participate in the men's 69 kg class.

Media coverage 
The main rights to Olympic coverage in Sri Lanka are held by Rupavahini.

See also
Sri Lanka at the Olympics
Sports in Sri Lanka

References

External links
Sri Lanka at the 2008 Beijing Summer Games
Badminton, Women's Singles Round of 64 results
Boxing, Men's Fly (51kg) Round of 32 results
Shooting, Men's 50m Pistol results
Shooting, Men's 10m Air Pistol results
Swimming, Men's 50m Freestyle results
Swimming, Women's 100m Breaststroke - Heat results
Weightlifting, Men's 69kg results

Nations at the 2008 Summer Olympics
2008
Summer Olympics